Abdul Hakim (c. 1620 – c. 1690) was a Bengali poet and translator who wrote several Bengali epics and also translated some Persian manuscripts.

Early life
Abdul Hakim was born in the village of Babupur in 1620. Babupur is generally said to be the modern-day village of Sudharam in the island of Sandwip. In addition to his fluency in the Bengali language, he also studied Arabic, Persian and Sanskrit.

Career
Abdul Hakim is well known for his patriotism and specially his love for the Bengali language. In Abdul Hakim's day, elite Bengali Muslims looked down upon it, favoured the Persian court language instead. Abdul Hakim criticized their disdainful attitude towards the local tongue.

Hakim's most notable work was Nur Nama (Story of Light), a depiction of the life of Muhammad. Other books he wrote are Shihabuddin Nama, Karbala, Lalmati Saifulmulk, Nasihat Nama, Chari Mokam Bhedh,  Shahar Nama, Hanifar Ladai, and Durre Majlish. He translated the Persian romance Yusuf Wa Zulekha (1483 AD) in Bengali.

References

Bengali male poets
17th-century Bengali poets
1620 births
1690 deaths
Bangladeshi writers
People from Sandwip Upazila
Bengali Muslims